Mekorama is a puzzle game created by indie game developer Martin Magni and was released for iOS and Android on May 16, 2016. The game was ported to the Nintendo Switch, PlayStation Vita, PlayStation 4, and Xbox One on March 26, 2020.

In Mekorama, the player takes the role as a robot to navigate through a diorama and reach the end goal of a level. The robot moves by tapping or clicking the screen; the player can view each level in a 360-degree angle by swiping the screen. The game also implements isometric view to visualize the gameplay. Mekorama also features a level editing system, in which users can create and share their levels through a QR code.

The game was awarded Jury's Honorable Mention in the 2017 International Mobile Gaming Awards.

Plot
The story of Mekorama occurs after the events of the game Odd Bot Out escapes from the factory. The story begins when a bot named B lands in a strange diorama after having its engine depleted of fuel. As the game progresses, B moves through various areas and obstacles including other bots and various mechanical objects.

Development
Mekorama was released on February 14, 2016 on iOS and March 14, 2016 on Android. The VR version was released on November 8, 2016. Mekorama released for PlayStation 4, Xbox One, Nintendo Switch, and PlayStation Vita on 2020.

References

2016 video games
IOS games
Android (operating system) games
Nintendo Switch games
Single-player video games
Puzzle video games
Video games developed in Sweden